Casino is the debut studio album by Swedish group Alcazar, released on 18 October 2000 in Sweden and on 8 February 2002 worldwide. It was produced and the group managed by Alexander Bard, formerly of Swedish glam-popsters, Army of Lovers. It includes the number-one singles "Crying at the Discoteque" and "Sexual Guarantee".

Track listing

Charts

References

Alcazar (band) albums
2000 debut albums